Hammamet (literally "Baths") is a town in Tunisia. Thanks to its beaches, it is a popular destination for swimming and water sports and is one of the primary tourist destinations in Tunisia. It is located in the south-eastern section of Cap Bon and is part of the Nabeul Governorate.

The reported number of inhabitants varies from 100,000 to 400,000 and the population quadruples due to tourists' arrival in the summer.

It is particularly known for jasmine, which is the namesake of the tourist resort of Yasmine Hammamet. All over Hammamet, souvenirs crafted from jasmine can be found.

Around Hammamet, suburbs are being built as migrants from the southern region of the country come to find employment. As a popular tourist destination, the city is economically important to Tunisia.

The 2005 World Scout Conference was held in Hammamet.

History 

In the 1st century, there was a settlement here known as Pupput. It was a town (now in the suburbs of Hammamet) that became a Roman colony in the 2nd century. In the 13th century, walls around town were built and medina of Hammamet was built in the 15th century. Then it came under Spanish and Turkish rule.

In 1601 it was the object of a successful Spanish attack. At that time the Spanish name for the place was "La Mahometa". Alonso de Contreras participated and tells the story in his autobiography.  Three hundred men took seven hundred prisoners, mostly women, and children because most of the men in the town had fled.

On 14 August 1605 there was another Spanish attack in which Contreras also participated but this time the result was disastrous for the attackers. It was carried out by six galleys, four from Malta, six from Sicily carrying Spanish and other Christian troops.  The initial taking of the town was successful as the Spanish managed to climb the walls and open the gates but then there was an unexpected call to retreat – it could not be later determined where or how it originated. In the confusion, the retreat fell into disorder and the Spanish were massacred at the beach by a much smaller number of Moors. There were 1200 men gathered at the beach trying to get back to their ships but the wind had changed and conditions were difficult. The leader of the expedition, Adelantado de Castilla, lost his life as he tried to swim out to the Spanish ships and as the captain in charge of his skiff fled and ignored his calls for help. That captain was later court-martialed and, when it became clear he would be sentenced to death, his own brother poisoned him. This story and more details can be found in Contreras' autobiography.

In World War II, it became one of the headquarters of the Nazi general Erwin Rommel. Festival international d'Hammamet was established in 1964.

Former Italian prime minister Bettino Craxi moved to Hammamet in 1994 as a fugitive. He died and was buried there in 2000.

Geography 
Hammamet is located in Nabeul Governorate in the east of Tunisia, it located to in the coast of Hammamet Golf. Hammamet is limited by Nabeul in northeast, Bou Argoub in North and Grombalia in northwest.

Transport 
Hammamet is located near of two airports : Tunis-Carthage Airport (70 km) and Enfidha Airport (50 km). A fast and comfortable coach service runs from Tunis bus station. In and around town, hail a taxi.

Tourism 
Tourism represents a big sector of the city's economy. There are many touristic sites in Hammamet:

Yassmine Hammamet 
Yassmine Hammamet is a seaside resort developed in the late 1990s. It's a touristic station modeled on Port El-Kantaoui located in the Gulf of Hammamet. It was Developed by the Société d'études et de développement d'Hammamet-Sud (SEDHS), and covers 277 hectares.

Yassmine Hammamet has 11 hotels of 5 stars, 25 hotels of 4 stars and 8 hotels of 3 stars.

A reproduction of an Arab medina called Medina Mediterranea, with its ramparts, souks, traditional housing, a theme park (Carthage Land) and a conference center have been set up. In addition, two casinos, seven thalassotherapy centers, a 1.5-kilometer long esplanade with its shopping malls, green spaces and entertainment centers complete the resort's layout.

Others tourist resorts 
Hammamet has others tourist resorts like Hammamet Nord, Hammamet Sud and the Medina.

Festival 

Hammamet is served by the Hammamet International Festival; a big Festival that takes place in summer.

Gallery

Notable people
 Bettino Craxi, former Italian Prime Minister
 Paul Klee, whose painting Hammamet with its Mosque (1918) is in the Berggruen Klee Collection
 Sophia Loren has a house situated on the beach just outside Hammamet centre
 German footballer Sami Khedira's paternal family is from Hammamet
 Italian Fashion Designer Elsa Schiaparelli owned a house in Hammamet

Climate
The climate is very much like the climate in Sousse. It borders a Hot-summer Mediterranean climate (Csa) and a Hot semi-arid climate (BSh) due to dry ground and hot temperatures in the summer.

International relations

Twin towns and sister cities
Hammamet is twinned with:

 Nevers, France
 Aqaba, Jordan

References

External links
 tripadvisor.com: Getting around Hammamet

 
Populated places in Tunisia
Communes of Tunisia
Seaside resorts in Tunisia